The 2020–21 Vanderbilt Commodores men's basketball team represented Vanderbilt University during the 2020–21 NCAA Division I men's basketball season. The team was led by second-year head coach Jerry Stackhouse, and played their home games at Memorial Gymnasium in Nashville, Tennessee as a member of the Southeastern Conference. In a season limited due to the ongoing COVID-19 pandemic, the Commodores finished the season 9–16, 3–13 in SEC play to finish in last place. They defeated Texas A&M in the firs round of the SEC tournament, but lost to Florida in the second round.

Previous season
The Commodores finished the 2019–20 season 11–21, 3–15 in SEC play to finish in last place. They lost in the first round of the SEC tournament to Arkansas.

Offseason

Departures

2020 recruiting class

Roster

Schedule and results

|-
!colspan=12 style=|Regular Season

|-
!colspan=12 style=| SEC tournament

References

Vanderbilt Commodores men's basketball seasons
Vanderbilt Commodores
Vanderbilt Commodores men's basketball
Vanderbilt Commodores men's basketball